Borzelan-e Sofla (also Romanized as Borzelān-e Soflá; also known as Borzelān-e Pā’īn) is a village in Qushkhaneh-ye Pain Rural District, Qushkhaneh District, Shirvan County, North Khorasan Province, Iran. At the 2006 census, its population was 163, in 32 families.

References 

Populated places in Shirvan County